is a puzzle game for the Game Boy and was released in July 1990.

Gameplay
The game is essentially a series of 36 jigsaw puzzles with pentominos that must be assembled into a specific shape. The puzzles start off with rectangular shapes and simple solutions, but the puzzles quickly grow more complex, with odder shapes like a rocket ship, a gun, and even enlarged versions of some of the pentominoes themselves. Each level is timed, and once the timer is started it cannot be stopped until the level is finished. One starts off the game with only three pentomino pieces, and at the completion of each early level, a new piece is awarded to the player.  At the final level, the player is given the 2x2 square O tetromino and must complete an 8x8 square puzzle.

After completing each level, the player was given a password to access that level at a later time.  Each password was a common English four-letter word, so that by guessing common four-letter words, players could potentially access levels they had not actually reached by playing the game.

Development and ports
The name of the game was inspired by Daedalus, the mythical character of Greek legend who created the labyrinth.

A faithful fan version was later coded for the MSX computer system by Karoshi Corporation in 2006 for the game development contest MSXdev'06.

The game has been ported to different platforms, such as PC and GP2X.

References

Daedalian Opus at GameFAQs

1990 video games
Game Boy games
GP2X games
MSX games
Puzzle video games
Vic Tokai games
Video games developed in Japan
Windows games